Air attack may refer to:
 An Aerial firefighting mission or series of missions
 An airstrike, a military attack by aircraft against ground targets
 A strategic bombing air raid
 Fighter Ace (video game), also called "Air attack", a 1997 flight simulator by Microsoft
 AirAttack, video game developed and published by Art In Games in 2010.
 Air attack, slang for an offensive strategy using primarily forward passes in Canadian and American football